"The Outing" is the 57th episode of the sitcom Seinfeld. First aired on February 11, 1993 on NBC, it is the 17th episode of the fourth season. In this episode, a reporter publicly "outs" Jerry and George as a homosexual couple, and they struggle to convince the rest of the world of their heterosexuality. The line "... not that there's anything wrong with that"—as a reference to homosexuality—has become a popular catchphrase among fans.

Plot
While at Monk's Café, Elaine Benes notices a woman in a nearby booth eavesdropping, and as a prank speaks to Jerry Seinfeld and George Costanza as if they were a closeted gay couple. The eavesdropping woman turns out to be Sharon, a New York University reporter who is planning on interviewing Jerry. Later, Sharon visits Jerry's apartment to conduct the interview. His and George's conversation during the interview inadvertently solidifies her misconception that they are gay. Eventually, they recognize her from the coffee shop, and strenuously deny that they are gay. Nevertheless, the interview with Jerry is published in the school newspaper, and subsequently gets picked up by the Associated Press, "outing" Jerry and George to their readers.

Throughout the episode, Jerry and George fear being seen as homosexual, yet also feel afraid they will be perceived as homophobic, so they condition their denials with the phrase "not that there's anything wrong with that."

Sharon asks to see Jerry, leading to them kissing in his apartment. George decides to use his (fake) orientation as an excuse to break up with his girlfriend, Allison. George tries to act outraged at finding Jerry making out with Sharon to prove that he is homosexual to Allison, but when Jerry does not follow along, George's ruse fails to convince her and Sharon walks out. In a last-ditch attempt to get Allison to break up with him, George tells her he is a porn actor, but this only makes her even more attracted to him.

Kramer enters his apartment with an attractive young man, causing George and Jerry to briefly wonder if he is gay. Kramer explains, "He's the phone man! ...Not that there's anything wrong with that."

Reception
Creators Larry David and Jerry Seinfeld were reportedly concerned about offending the gay community with this episode. Their concerns were unfounded, as "The Outing" won a GLAAD Media Award (Gay & Lesbian Alliance Against Defamation) for Outstanding Comedy Episode.

References

External links

1993 American television episodes
1993 in LGBT history
American LGBT-related television episodes
Seinfeld (season 4) episodes